Robson Augusto Ka Hai Leung (born 22 April 1993 in Brazil), commonly known as Leung Ka Hai, is a former Hong Kong professional footballer of partial Brazilian descent.

Early years
Born in Brazil to a Hongkonger father and a Brazilian mother, Leung followed his father and moved to Hong Kong when he was 9 years old. He then joined the youth team of Kitchee, and help Kitchee to win the under-15 group of Nike Hong Kong Premier Cup in 2008. He, along with his team mates, had a chance to compete with other 11 teams in mainland China for the chance to the Old Trafford.

Club career

In March 2008, Kitchee submitted the player list for 2008 AFC Cup. Leung was selected and listed on the list. Just a month later, on 26 April 2008, Leung Ka Hai made his senior career debut against Lanwa Redbull as a 75th-minute substitute. At the age of 15 years and 4 days, Leung was the youngest-ever debutante in the Hong Kong First Division League, a record previously held by his teammate Lo Kwan Yee. In the summer of 2011, Leung was loaned to Hong Kong Second Division club Tai Chung. However, in January 2012, he was called back to Kitchee for the 2012 AFC Cup. Leung joined Sun Hei on loan from Kitchee until the end of 2013–2014 season.

On 31 January 2018, Dreams FC announced that they had signed Leung.

Playing style
Like a usual Brazilian full-back, Leung always joins attack from the back in a match although he plays as a right-back. Due to his aggressive playing style, he was called as Cafu.

Career statistics
 As of 26 September 2012

1 – Since Tai Chung was playing in the Hong Kong Second Division in the 2011–12 season, the club would compete in the Junior Shield but not in the Senior Shield.

References

External links

Leung Ka Hai at HKFA

1993 births
Living people
Association football fullbacks
Brazilian people of Hong Kong descent
Hong Kong footballers
Hong Kong First Division League players
Hong Kong Premier League players
Sun Hei SC players
Kitchee SC players
Southern District FC players
Tai Chung FC players
R&F (Hong Kong) players
Dreams Sports Club players
Hong Kong people of Brazilian descent
Footballers at the 2014 Asian Games
Asian Games competitors for Hong Kong